The Front for the Restoration of Unity and Democracy is a political party in Djibouti. It is aligned with the interests of the Afar people who live in that country, although it has supporters residing outside of Djibouti.

Formation and rebellion

Rebellion against the government
Three Afar groups—Action for the Revision of Order in Djibouti, the Front for the Restoration of Right and Equality, and the Djibouti Patriotic Resistance Front—merged in 1991 to form FRUD. In late 1991, FRUD launched a rebellion against the Issa-dominated government.

Nearly 1,000 people died during the conflict until 1994.

New insurgency (1994-2014)

After the rebellion, the FRUD-C (Front pour la restauration de l’unité et de la démocratie – Combattant, or Front for the Restoration of Unity and Democracy – Combatant; alternatively called “FRUD Ahmed Dini faction”, “FRUD-Radicals”, or “FRUD-Armé”) was founded as a split from the original group and started a new insurgency against the government of Djibouti with the support of Eritrea with arms and probably logistics in an effort to cut the supply routes from Djibouti to landlocked Ethiopia during the Eritrean–Ethiopian War, the insurgency caused 100 deaths.
In may 2001, the FRUD-C signed a peace agreement with the government.

On 2014 the violence return with 12 fatalities.

Party split
In 1994 the party split into two factions: a moderate wing, led by Ali Mohamed Daoud, signed a peace agreement with the government on 26 December 1994 in Aba'a, while other wing, led by Ahmed Dini Ahmed, denounced this agreement and continued armed resistance.

Dini faction
The other faction held a congress in northern Djibouti for six days in late September 1994, and it announced on 30 September 1994 that the congress delegates "unanimously reaffirmed their determination to pursue armed struggle until their political goals are satisfied," while electing Dini at the head of the faction's executive committee.

Other faction
At the same time, the Daoud faction's determined to isolate the other faction's top leadership—Ahmed and its Vice-President Mohamed Adoyta Youssouf—deciding that they could not "speak on behalf of the FRUD or to commit it in any manner.

As a result of its December 1994 agreement with the government, the moderate faction was given two ministerial positions on 8 June 1995: FRUD President Daoud became Minister of Health and Social Affairs, while FRUD Secretary-General Ougoure Kifle Ahmed became Minister of Agriculture and Water Resources. The moderate faction was formally legalized in March 1996. On 15–16 April 1997, it held its First Ordinary Congress, electing a 153-member National Council and a 21-member Executive Committee. Although the party continued to be led by Daoud, who is an Afar, the composition of the leadership selected at this congress reflected the party's efforts to appeal to other ethnic groups aside from its Afar base. Djama Djellai, an Issa, was chosen as First Vice-President, and Ismael Youssouf, a Gadabursi, was chosen as Second Vice-President. The Executive Committee included several representatives of ethnic groups aside from the Afar: four were Issa, two were Gadabursi, two were Arabs, and one was Isaaq. FRUD took part in the December 1997 parliamentary election in alliance with the ruling People's Rally for Progress (RPP), and this alliance won 78.5% of the vote, taking all 65 seats in the National Assembly.

1999 presidential election
Ismail Omar Guelleh of the RPP stood in the presidential election held on April 9, 1999, as the joint candidate of the RPP and FRUD, receiving 74.02% of the vote. Prior to the election, Abatte Ebo Adou, a FRUD parliamentary deputy, announced that he would stand as a presidential candidate and was expelled from FRUD as a result.

For its part, the radical faction eventually signed its own peace agreement with the government in 2001.

FRUD held its Second Ordinary Congress on 28–29 April 2002. Daoud was re-elected as FRUD President at this congress, and the party's Executive Committee was reduced from 27 to 19 members.

2003 parliamentary election
In the parliamentary election held on 10 January 2003, the moderate faction was part of the Union for the Presidential Majority (Union pour la Majorité Présidentielle, UMP), which won 62.7% of the popular vote and all seats. The radical faction participated in the election as part of the opposition coalition, the Union for a Democratic Change.

Third Ordinary Congress
The moderate faction held its Third Ordinary Congress, attended by 1,250 delegates, on 30–31 May 2007. Daoud was re-elected as President of FRUD by acclamation, without opposition. At the congress, FRUD's National Council was expanded to 335 members; the FRUD Executive Committee named at this congress included 26 members, four of whom were women. FRUD was again part of the UMP for the February 2008 parliamentary election; the UMP again won all seats amidst an opposition boycott.

Electoral history

National Assembly elections

References

1991 establishments in Djibouti
Ethnic political parties
Political parties established in 1991
Political parties in Djibouti
Rebel groups in Djibouti